The Seiko-Tucson Match Play Championship was a golf tournament on the Champions Tour from 1984 to 1986. It was played in Tucson, Arizona at the Randolph Park Municipal Golf Club. It was played using a match play format instead of the more common stroke play. A PGA Tour event (Seiko-Tucson Match Play Championship) was played concurrently at the same location.

The purse for the 1986 tournament was US$300,000, with $75,000 going to the winner.  The tournament was founded in 1984 as the Seiko-Tucson Senior Match Play Championship.

Winners
Seiko-Tucson Match Play Championship
1986 Don January

Seiko-Tucson Senior Match Play Championship
1985 Harold Henning
1984 Gene Littler

Source:

References

 

Former PGA Tour Champions events
Golf in Arizona
Sports in Tucson, Arizona
Events in Tucson, Arizona
Recurring sporting events established in 1984
Recurring sporting events disestablished in 1986
1984 establishments in Arizona
1986 disestablishments in Arizona